Rhona Robertson (born 19 July 1970 in Auckland, New Zealand) is a former female badminton player from New Zealand. She is a veteran of two Olympic Games and four Commonwealth Games.

At the 1994 Commonwealth Games she won a bronze medal in the women's singles. Robertson won another bronze medal at the 1998 Commonwealth Games partnering Tammy Jenkins in the women's doubles. Four years later at the 2002 Commonwealth Games she won another bronze medal in the mixed team.

References

1970 births
Living people
New Zealand female badminton players
Olympic badminton players of New Zealand
Commonwealth Games bronze medallists for New Zealand
Badminton players at the 1990 Commonwealth Games
Badminton players at the 1994 Commonwealth Games
Badminton players at the 1998 Commonwealth Games
Badminton players at the 2002 Commonwealth Games
Commonwealth Games medallists in badminton
Badminton players at the 1992 Summer Olympics
Badminton players at the 1996 Summer Olympics
Medallists at the 1994 Commonwealth Games
Medallists at the 1998 Commonwealth Games
Medallists at the 2002 Commonwealth Games